The 1973 enlargement of the European Communities was the first enlargement of the European Communities (EC), now the European Union (EU). Denmark, Ireland and the United Kingdom (UK) acceded to the EC on 1 January 1973. Gibraltar and Greenland also joined the EC as part of the United Kingdom and Denmark respectively, but the Danish Faroe Islands, the other British Overseas Territories and the Crown dependencies of the United Kingdom did not join the EC.

Ireland and Denmark both held referendums in 1972 in May and October respectively, and the United Kingdom held a referendum in 1975, on membership of the EC, all which approved membership of the EC. Norway planned to accede, but this was rejected in a referendum held in September 1972. In 1992 Norway again applied to join, but voters again rejected the proposal in a 1994 referendum.

Greenland later withdrew from the EC on 1 January 1985 after a referendum in 1982. This was followed by the United Kingdom holding a referendum in 2016 on membership which resulted in the United Kingdom voting to leave the EU.

Background
The United Kingdom was still recovering from the economic cost of the Second World War. The Republic of Ireland, while an independent state, was economically dependent on the UK, which accounted for nearly 75% of Ireland's exports, as codified in the Anglo-Irish Free trade agreement of 1966.

In 1960 the European Free Trade Association (EFTA) was established and was formed by Austria, Denmark, Norway, Portugal, Sweden, Switzerland and the United Kingdom. These countries were often referred to as the Outer Seven, as opposed to the Inner Six of the founding members of the European Community (EC). The EFTA was founded by a convention known as the Stockholm Convention in 1960, with the aim of liberalisation of trade in goods amongst its member states.
On 31 July 1961 the United Kingdom, Ireland and Denmark applied to join the EC. In 1963, after negotiations, France vetoed the United Kingdom's application because of the aversion of Charles de Gaulle to the UK, which he considered a "trojan horse" for the United States. De Gaulle resigned the French presidency in 1969. In the 1970s, the EFTA states concluded free trade agreements with the EC.

Impact

See also
Denmark and the euro
United Kingdom and the euro
1981 enlargement of the European Communities
1986 enlargement of the European Communities
1995 enlargement of the European Union
2004 enlargement of the European Union
2007 enlargement of the European Union
2013 enlargement of the European Union

References

1973 in Europe
History of the European Union
January 1973 events in Europe
1973 in international relations